Lilian Louise Staveley (1871–1928) was a Christian writer and mystic whose anonymous works have only recently been credited to her.

Early life
Lilian Louise Staveley (née Bowdoin) was the daughter of James Bowdoin (1811–1897) and his wife Charlotte Kate (née Costobadie) (1839–1920). Lilian was born to an affluent family, descended on both sides from Huguenots of the old French nobility. Her early life was not one of outward religious observance, but was rather one of privilege and learning. Along with two brothers, she was educated by tutors, governesses, and at boarding schools. She spoke four languages fluently and spent her summers in Italy. When she came of age in society she entered into a privileged world of balls and suitors.

As a young woman she became an atheist; a painful decision with which she struggled for two years.

While in Rome, visiting the temples, she was moved by the beauty of her surroundings and "a longing for her Lord so painfully real that the longing could not be denied".

While she was highly sought after and offered many proposals, she entered into a secret engagement with Brigadier General William Cathcart Staveley but her parents refused, due to his lack of money, to allow the romance. Meanwhile, her father, with whom she was quite close, suffered from a heart condition that left him gravely ill for two years before his eventual death in 1897. His death had a profound impact on his daughter. "I became a semi-invalid, always suffering, too delicate to marry." When her health returned, she married Staveley on 30 September 1899 at Kensington, London though they were quickly separated for a time when he left for the Anglo-Boer War.

At the end of the First World War she brought to John M. Watkins of London a manuscript. For the sake of her privacy and because her husband was still living and a general in the Army, she insisted on anonymity. It was only after her death that General Staveley learned that his wife of nearly thirty years had led a hidden spiritual life.

Writings
Staveley's writings are notable for their unassuming style – being the personal narrative of one person's spiritual journey - at once deeply personal and humble. It is the journey not of an unusual person; rather it is the progress of a self-described "ordinary soul" possessing, however, extraordinary love for God.

Anonymity
The three books sthat appeared in her lifetime were all anonymously published; keeping the "white-heat" of her "spirit-living" a secret from the world, even from her beloved husband. It is only recently that her works have been published under her name, and she has yet to receive the fame due her for her prominent works.

The feminine principle
One of the dilemmas that Staveley struggled with was that of the 'feminine principle'. She saw across history and religion a tendency by those in religious power, by men who were otherwise great and holy, to look down on womankind. She feared that in God's eyes also she was not of the 'acceptable sex'. This apparent disparagement she could not understand: "What profound injustice — to suffer so much and to receive no recognition whatever whilst men walked off with all the joys after leading very questionable lives!" For several years her shame at being a woman was such that, although she continued to believe in and pay homage to God, she could do so only with a certain reverent sadness, and not with love.

Eventually, Staveley came to the conclusion that, the arrogance of certain men aside; "Clothed in the body of either man or woman, the soul is predominantly feminine — the Feminine Principle beloved of, and returning to, the Eternal Masculine of God." The spiritual journey of each soul is a journey shared alike by man and by woman.

Legacy
In his book Modern Mystics (London: John Murray, 1935; reprinted New York: University Books, 1970), Sir Francis Younghusband, a writer, diplomat and Himalayan explorer, explicitly compares Staveley with the likes of Ramakrishna and St. Therese de Lisieux. Younghusband also points out that the spiritual experiences Staveley describes bear "remarkable resemblances to the experiences of Hindu mystics".

Her writings were also known to Evelyn Underhill, a respected authority on comparative mysticism, as well as to Frithjof Schuon, a pre-eminent writer in the Perennialist school of comparative religion.

Books
During her lifetime, Staveley published three books:
The Prodigal Returns (John M. Watkins, 1921)
The Romance of the Soul (John M. Watkins, 1920) 
The Golden Fountain or, the Soul’s Love for God: Being Some Thoughts and Confessions of one of His Lovers (John M. Watkins, 1919; reprinted by World Wisdom Books, 1982).

A later compilation of her writings is
A Christian Woman's Secret (World Wisdom Books, 2008).

References

External links
 
 Staveley's works at manybooks.net

1878 births
1928 deaths
20th-century Christian mystics
20th-century British women writers
20th-century British writers
Christianity and women
Protestant mystics
Christian writers
Pseudonymous women writers
Women mystics
20th-century pseudonymous writers